Nigah Marda Ayi Ve is a 2023 Punjabi-language, romantic-drama film written & directed by Rupinder Inderjit, starring Gurnam Bhullar and Sargun Mehta.

Synopsis
An adventurous road trip takes Harman and Scarlett on a journey not only through love and life but also leaves them heartbroken. Will the star-crossed lovers ever meet?

Cast
 Gurnam Bhullar as Harman
 Sargun Mehta
 Nisha Bano
 Jasneet Kooner
 Adi Chugh

Release
The film was released on 17 March 2023.

References

External links
 

2023 films
Punjabi-language Indian films
Indian romantic drama films